Rawinala is a foundation that provides education and care for people with MDVI (Multiple Disabilities and Visual Impairment) in Indonesia. Rawinala has 5 main Programs: Education, Dormitories and Orphanage, Sheltered Workshop, Community Based Rehabilitation and Training Center.

History
Rawinala was founded in 1973 by a group of GKJ church community. Currently Rawinala has over 60 students, from ages 2 to 20. Rawinala is also the home of 10 Vulnarable Adults with MDVI. The term "Rawinala" comes from ancient Javanese language which means "Light of the Heart".

Vision
To be pre-eminent center of comprehensive services for children and adult with Multiple Disabilities and Visual Impairment

Mission
Rawinala aims to provide excellent education, care and development opportunity for people with Multiple Disabilities and Visual Impairment in Indonesia, by strengthening our professionalism in education, infrastructure and network.

Motto
Give your hand and heart to serve

References
Official Site
facebook page

Special education